The Wild Baby is a children's book series about a wild young infant boy named Ben, written by Barbro Lindgren and illustrated by Eva Eriksson. In 2010, it was made into puppetry.

Books

References

Swedish children's book series
Child characters in literature
Works by Barbro Lindgren
Book series introduced in 1980
Fictional infants